The 1998 Giro d'Italia was the 81st edition of the Giro d'Italia, one of cycling's Grand Tours. The field consisted of 162 riders, and 94 riders finished the race.

By rider

By nationality

References

1998 Giro d'Italia
1998